Brevundimonas aveniformis is a gram-negative, rod-like, stalk-producing bacterium belonging to the genus Brevundimonas.

References

External links
Type strain of Brevundimonas aveniformis at BacDive -  the Bacterial Diversity Metadatabase	

Caulobacterales